Muay Thai competitions at the 2021 Southeast Asian Games took place at Vĩnh Phúc Sporting Hall in Vĩnh Phúc, Vietnam from 17 to 22 May 2022.

Medal table

Medalists

Waikru events

Men's events

Women's events

Notes

References

Muay Thai
Southeast Asian Games
2021